Gaspésie–Îles-de-la-Madeleine is an administrative region of Quebec consisting of the Gaspé Peninsula (Gaspésie) and the Îles-de-la-Madeleine.  It lies in the Gulf of Saint Lawrence at the eastern extreme of southern Quebec. The predominant economic activities are fishing, forestry and tourism.

Region

The administrative region of Gaspésie–Îles-de-la-Madeleine was created on December 22, 1987.  It brings together two geographical units: the Gaspé peninsula  (20,102.69 km2) and the Magdalen Islands archipelago (205.4 km2). The population was 90,311 at the time of the 2016 census.  The region's interior, 80% of which is covered by coniferous forests, is among the most rugged terrain in the province.  Rich soils cover the land along the coast and within the region's river valleys.  Important mineral deposits are also found in this region.

Forty-two local municipalities are located in the Gaspésie–Îles-de-la-Madeleine region, along with seven unorganized territories, two reserves, and one Mi'kmaq community.  With the exception of a few villages, the entire population is spread out along the coast, in villages with fewer than 5,000 inhabitants.  Its largest community is the city of Gaspé (2011 population 15,163), near the tip of the peninsula.

The region has undergone many stresses which have influenced the evolution of its economy.  The decrease in population as well as in primary resources, the weak diversity of secondary economic activities, and the seasonal nature of many of its jobs are all elements that explain the fragility of the job market. Tourism plays a vital part in the region's economy.

Administrative divisions

Regional county municipalities
 Avignon Regional County Municipality
 Bonaventure Regional County Municipality
 Le Rocher-Percé Regional County Municipality
 La Côte-de-Gaspé Regional County Municipality	
 La Haute-Gaspésie Regional County Municipality

Independent municipalities
 Grosse-Île
 Les Îles-de-la-Madeleine

Mi'gmawei Mawiomi
 Gesgapegiag
 Listuguj

Major communities
Carleton-sur-Mer
Chandler
Gaspé
Grande-Rivière
Les Îles-de-la-Madeleine
New Richmond
Sainte-Anne-des-Monts

References

External links

 Portail régional de la Gaspésie-Îles-de-la-Madeleine Official website
 Municipalities and cities of Gaspé region
 CRÉ

 
Administrative regions of Quebec